is a passenger railway station located in the city of Matsuyama, Ehime Prefecture, Japan. It is operated by the private transportation company Iyotetsu.

Lines
During most of the day, railway trains arrive every fifteen minutes. Trains continue from Matsuyama City Station on the Yokogawara Line to Yokogawara Station.

Layout
Baishinji Station is an above-ground station with two opposed side platforms and two tracks, and is unmanned. Behind Platform 2 is the coast. Platform 1 is the up/down main line, and Platform 2 is the down main line. This is to allow trains bound for Takahama to enter Platform 1 in the event that platform 2 is hit by high waves during abnormal weather. The double-track section from Matsuyama-shi Station ends at this station, and the section to Takahama Station, the terminal station, is a single track

History
Baishinji Station was opened on 6 July 1899 as a temporary stop, and was elevated to full station status on 1 May 1931.

Surrounding area
Baishinji Park

See also
 List of railway stations in Japan

References

External links

Iyotetsu Station Information

Iyotetsu Takahama Line
Railway stations in Ehime Prefecture
Railway stations in Japan opened in 1899
Railway stations in Matsuyama, Ehime